Lindsay Margaret Ann Volpin (born 1962) is a female British sport shooter.

Sport shooting career
Volpin represented England and won a silver medal in the 50 metres three-position rifle pairs with Karen Morton, in addition to competing in the rifle prone events, at the 1994 Commonwealth Games in Victoria, British Columbia, Canada.

References

Living people
1962 births
British female sport shooters
Commonwealth Games medallists in shooting
Commonwealth Games silver medallists for England
Shooters at the 1994 Commonwealth Games
20th-century British women
Medallists at the 1994 Commonwealth Games